Mycobacterium gastri is a species of the phylum Actinomycetota (Gram-positive bacteria with high guanine and cytosine content, one of the dominant phyla of all bacteria), belonging to the genus Mycobacterium.

Description
Moderately long to long, Gram-positive, aerobic, nonmotile and acid-fast rods.

Colony characteristics
Nonchromogenic, smooth to rough, white colonies on Löwenstein-Jensen medium and smooth or somewhat granular on Middlebrook 7H10 agar.

Physiology
Growth on Löwenstein-Jensen medium or on Middlebrook 7H10 agar at 37 °C, (temperature range 25 °C-40 °C), within 7 or more days.
Does not grow in the presence of ethambutol or isoniazid.

Differential characteristics
Closely related to M. kansasii
 M. gastri and M. kansasii share an identical 16S rDNA sequence. Species differentiation is possible by differences in the ITS and hsp65 sequences.
M. kansasii produces a photochromogenic yellow pigment.
AccuProbes for M. kansasii are negative.

Pathogenesis
Casual resident of human stomachs, but not considered a cause of disease.
Biosafety level 1

Type strain
First isolated from human gastric specimen.  Also found in soil.
Strain ATCC 15754 = CCUG 20995 = CIP 104530 = DSM 43505 = JCM 12407.

References

Wayne, L. 1966. Classification and identification of mycobacteria. III. Species within Group III. American Review of Respiratory Diseases,  93, 919–928.]

External links
Type strain of Mycobacterium gastri at BacDive -  the Bacterial Diversity Metadatabase

Acid-fast bacilli
gastri
Bacteria described in 1966